The 2002 Daily Star Premier League was a professional non-ranking snooker tournament that was played from 5 January to 12 May 2002.

Ronnie O'Sullivan won in the final 9–4 against John Higgins.


League phase

Top four qualified for the play-offs. If points were level then most frames won determined their positions. If two players had an identical record then the result in their match determined their positions. If that ended 4–4 then the player who got to four first was higher.

 (Breaks above 50 shown between (parentheses), century breaks are indicated with bold.)

 5 January – Brangwyn Hall, Swansea, Wales
 Ronnie O'Sullivan 5–3 Matthew Stevens → (90)-0, (59) 90–11, 0-(74), 54- 17, 0-(124), 23–72, (60) 66–0, 87–1
 Mark Williams 4–4 Jimmy White → 35–59, 0-(99), 0-(84), (93)-6, (126)-6, (69) 84–12, (61) 78–28, 43–72
 Ronnie O'Sullivan 6–2 John Higgins → (102)-7, (94) 95–28, (75) 89–36, 0-(83), (54) 68–1, 0-(96), (103)-8, (113) – 6
 6 January -Brangwyn Hall, Swansea, Wales
 Matthew Stevens 4–4 James Wattana → 67–37, 65-(63), 43–74, (60) 77–31, 25–74, 80–35, 42–75, 24–45
 John Higgins 5–3 Steve Davis → (68)-(65), 41–84 (60), (84) 88–0, 29-(61), 77–18, (66)-8, 68–36, 4–80
 Mark Williams 4–4 James Wattana → (51) 59–2, (64)-65, 69–46, (40) 52–78 (54), 64–35, (67) 116–0, 53–76 (63), 16–63
 19 January – Floral Hall, Southport, England
 Jimmy White 6-2 James Wattana → (56) 80–0, 48–50, (82) 88–4, 63–38, (56)-63, 62–22, (52) 63–28, (60) 81–29
 Mark Williams 4–4 Steve Davis → (68) 97–8, (54) 83–53, 67–0, 4–84 (59), 18–85 (69), (93) 94–0, 51–69, 0–81 (65)
 20 January – Floral Hall, Southport, England
 Ronnie O'Sullivan 8–0 James Wattana → 60–32, (81)-33, (75) 77–7, (69)-(59), 69–66 (62), (96)-0, (60) 77–0, (68) 75–16
 John Higgins 5–3 Matthew Stevens → (129)-0, (84)-0, (69) 70–6, 0-(78), 0–98 (97), 56–34, 56–46, 0–97 (74)
 Ronnie O'Sullivan 5–3 Steve Davis → 96–31, (77)-0, (52) 72–29, (75) 79–0, 62–70, 40–70, (54) 64–15, 0-(131)
 16 February – The Pavilion, Flint, Wales
 Steve Davis 4–4 James Wattana → 6–78, 56–34, (64) 71-(54), 14–71, 10–72, 56–45, (62) 98–5, 22–82 (77)
 Ronnie O'Sullivan 2–6 Mark Williams → 82–0, 0-(76), 0–110 (57, 54), 8–71, 32-(105), 53–66 (54), 22-(70), (89)-0
 17 February – The Pavilion, Flint, Wales
 Matthew Stevens 5–3 Steve Davis → 62–28, 37–65 (54), (102) 103–28, (69) 70–26, 0-(97), 44–73, (125) 133- 5, (74) 79–0
 John Higgins 6–2 James Wattana → (137)-0, (90) 103–2, (60) 81–7, (57)-7, 0-(106), 74–40, 31–63, 67–27
 Jimmy White 4–4 Steve Davis → (63) 89–42, 71–69 (53), 0–91 (54), 14–73, 14–59, 64–7, (50) 69–1, 30–69 (60)
 16 March – Mansfield Leisure Centre, Mansfield, England
 Matthew Stevens 3–5 Jimmy White → (64)-53 (52), 8–118 (79), 71–37, 60–9, 0–77, 18–114 (82), 63–72, 54 – 72
 Mark Williams 6–2 John Higgins → (126)-4, 46–71 (70), 25–78 (70), (63) 67–1, (54) 61–12, (132)-0, (125)-0, (67)-46
 17 March – Mansfield Leisure Centre, Mansfield, England
 Ronnie O'Sullivan 7–1 Jimmy White → 69–9, (106)-30, 65–25, (105)-0, (104)-0, (50) 75–25, 54–50, 1–71
 Mark Williams 3–5 Matthew Stevens → 30–84, (66) 67–14, 32–72, 37–86 (68), 58–10, 37–57, 25–67, (65) 105- 0
 John Higgins 5–3 Jimmy White → 45–67, (71)-(66), 7–67, 61–1, (66) 67–22, 64–56, (56)-14, 42–69 (64)

Play-offs 
10–11 May – Rothes Halls, Glenrothes, Scotland

*(77) 93–6, 37–67, (62) 70–20, (57) 79–0, (91) 108–17, 69–9, (60) 62–9
**(65) 75–33, 68–55, 59–23, (126)-0, 0-(81), (85) 112–6, 1–76 (72), (60) 73–0
***(60) 109–6, 45–56, (72) 75–42, 5–78 (55), (68) 73–0, (109) 115–19, 43–66, (110) 111–14, (70)-0, 38–89 (76), (95)-30, 63–14, (62) 106–16

Century breaks

 137, 132, 129, 126, 126, 125  John Higgins
 131  Steve Davis
 126, 105  Mark Williams
 125, 124, 102  Matthew Stevens
 113, 110, 109, 106, 105, 104, 103, 102  Ronnie O'Sullivan
 106  James Wattana

References

2002
Premier League
Premier League Snooker